is a town located in Kamikawa Subprefecture, Hokkaido, Japan. As of September 2016, the town has an estimated population of 10,374, and a density of 15 persons per km2. The total area is 677.16 km2.

Overview
Biei is famous for its views of wide fields and hills, and is used as a backdrop for many Japanese commercials and TV programmes. The bright colours of its fields attract thousands of visitors in July and August.

The town also houses the Shinzo Maeda Photo Art Gallery.

Since 1992, Biei has held the "Biei Healthy Marathon", which attracts runners from all around Japan.

Climate

Gallery

References

External links

Official Website 

 
Towns in Hokkaido